Ilam Province is divided into 11 counties, 28 districts, 52 rural districts.On 4 January 2020, Holeylan, having been a district of Chardavol County, became the 11th county of Ilam province.

List 
The following is the list of counties of Ilam province.

See also 
Ilam Province

Notes

References 

 
 

 
Iran,Ilam
Ilam